Vountus Indra Mawan (born 23 March 1989) is a former Malaysian badminton player. In  2007, he reach the semi-final round of the Asian Junior Championships in the boys' doubles event partnered with Mohamad Arif Abdul Latif and settle for bronze medal. He won his first senior title at the 2008 Iran Fajr International tournament in the men's doubles event. He is currently the Malaysia national junior under-18 boys' doubles coach.

Achievements

Asian Junior Championships 
Boys' doubles

BWF International Challenge/Series 
Men's doubles

Mixed doubles

  BWF International Challenge tournament
  BWF International Series tournament

References

External links 
 

1989 births
Living people
People from Sabah
Malaysian male badminton players
Universiade bronze medalists for Malaysia
Universiade medalists in badminton
Medalists at the 2015 Summer Universiade